The First Legislature of Quebec was summoned in 1867 when the new Canadian province of Quebec was created, as part of the new country of Canada.

The Legislature had two chambers:  the elected lower house, the Legislative Assembly, and the appointed upper house, the Legislative Council. The first general election for the Legislative Assembly was held in August and September, 1867, and returned a majority for the Quebec Conservative Party led by Premier Pierre-Joseph-Olivier Chauveau.  The Liberal Party of Quebec formed the Official Opposition.

The Chauveau government then appointed the first members to the Legislative Council in November, 1867, who were sworn into their positions in December, 1867. The Conservatives had a strong majority in the Legislative Council.

The first session of the Legislature was called on December 27, 1867. The Legislature had four annual sessions, until its dissolution on May 27, 1871, triggering the second general election.

Creation of the Legislature 

The province of Quebec was created on July 1, 1867, when the British North America Act, 1867 came into force, splitting the old Province of Canada into the new provinces of Quebec (formerly Lower Canada) and Ontario (formerly Upper Canada).  That Act also created the Legislature of Quebec, composed of the Lieutenant Governor, the Legislative Assembly and the Legislative Council.

The Act provided that the Lieutenant Governor was to be appointed by the Governor General of Canada for a term of five years, subject to dismissal for cause. The Legislative Assembly was to consist of sixty-five members, elected in single-member constituencies. The Legislative Assembly was to last for four years, subject to being dissolved earlier by the Lieutenant Governor. The Legislative Council was to consist of twenty-four members, appointed for life.  Each Legislative Councillor was appointed to represent one of the twenty-four divisions which had formerly been used in the Legislative Council of the Province of Canada

Elections and Qualifications

The first election was conducted under the electoral laws of the former Province of Canada, which had been continued in force until such time as the Quebec Legislature enacted electoral laws specifically for Quebec.

Right to vote 

The right to vote in elections to the Legislative Assembly was not universal.  Only male British subjects (by birth or naturalisation), aged 21 and older, were eligible to vote, and only if they met a property qualification. For residents of cities and towns, the qualification was being the owner, tenant or occupant of real property assessed at three hundred dollars, or at an assessed yearly value of thirty dollars.  For residents of townships and parishes, the requirements were either an assessment of two hundred dollars, or an assessed yearly value of twenty dollars.

Women were expressly prohibited from voting, "for any Electoral Division whatever".

Judges and many municipal and provincial officials were also barred from voting, particularly officials with duties relating to public revenue. Election officials were also barred from voting.

Voting was done by open ballotting, where the voters publicly declared their vote to the election officials.

Qualification for the Legislative Assembly 

Candidates for the Legislative Assembly had to meet a significant property qualification.  A candidate had to own real property in the Province of Canada, worth at least £500 in British sterling, over and above any encumbrances on the property.

Qualification for the Legislative Council 

The qualifications for the members of the Legislative Council were the same as for the members of the Senate of Canada.

Those requirements were:
 Be of the full age of thirty years;
 Be a British subject, either natural-born or naturalised;
 Possess real property in Quebec worth at least $4,000, over and above any debts or incumbrances on the property;
 Have a net worth of at least $4,000, over and above debts and liabilities;
 Reside in Quebec;
 Reside in, or possess his qualifying real property, in the division he was named to represent.

The provisions of the British North America Act, 1867 did not explicitly bar women from being called to the Senate of Canada.  However, until the Persons Case in 1929, it was assumed that women could not be called to the Senate, and thus were also barred from the Legislative Council.  In any event, no woman was ever appointed to the Legislative Council.

First government and election 

The first Governor General of Canada, Viscount Monck, appointed Narcisse-Fortunat Belleau, a former premier of the Province of Canada, as the first Lieutenant Governor, effective July 1, 1867. Belleau in turn appointed Pierre-Joseph-Olivier Chauveau as premier on July 15, 1867. Chauveau had formerly been active in politics as a member of the Legislative Assembly and the Cabinet of the Province of Canada, but he had been out of electoral politics since 1855. He was appointed as a compromise candidate to begin the government of the new province.

The first general election for the Legislative Assembly was held in August and September 1867. Chauveau and the Conservatives won a strong majority of fifty-one seats in the sixty-five seat Assembly.  The Chaveau government then appointed the twenty-four members of the Legislative Council.  Twenty-one of the appointed members supported the Conservative party.

Legislative Assembly

Party standings 

The 1867 elections returned a majority in the Legislative Assembly for the Conservative Party, led by Premier Chauveau.

Members of the Legislative Assembly 

The following candidates were elected to the Legislative Assembly in the 1867 election. The Premier of Quebec is indicated by Bold italics. The Speaker of the Legislative Assembly is indicated by small caps. Cabinet Ministers are indicated by Italics.

Reasons for Vacancies

By-elections 

There were eight by-elections during the term of the First Legislature.

Reason for Vacancy

Legislative Council

Party standings 

Following the election, the Chauveau government appointed twenty-four individuals to the Legislative Council.  The result was a Council with a strong Conservative majority.

Members during the First Legislature

The Speaker of the Legislative Council is indicated by small caps.  Cabinet members are indicated by italics.

Qualifications of the Legislative Councillors 

Sixteen of the individuals appointed had previously been involved in the government of the Province of Canada, sitting in either the Legislative Assembly or the Legislative Council:  Beaudry, Beaubien, Proulx, Dostaler, Le Boutillier, Bryson, Thibaudeau, Panet, Boucher de Boucherville, Archambeault, Prud'homme, Armstrong, Ross, Gingras, Ferrier and Hale.

Nine of the individuals had been involved in municipal politics, including former mayors of Montreal:  Beaudry, Wood, Rodier, Starnes, Bryson, Lemaire, Archambeault, McGreevy, and Ferrier.

Five of the individuals were involved in business or their seigneuries: Dionne, Thibaudeau, Chaussegros de Léry, Fraser de Berry and McGreevy.

First Quebec Ministry:  Chauveau Cabinet, 1867-1873 

The first Cabinet for Quebec consisted of Premier Chauveau and six other Cabinet ministers. Chauveau and four of the ministers were Members of the Legislative Assembly, while two were Members of the Legislative Council. Chauveau held other ministries, in addition to being premier.

Leader of the Opposition 

When the Legislature first met, the Liberals did not have a formal party structure or leader.  As a result, there was no official Leader of the Opposition for the first session of the Legislature.  Henri-Gustave Joly de Lotbinière gradually emerged as the leader of the Liberals.  Late in the second session held in 1869, he was formally elected Liberal leader and took the position in the House opposite to the Premier, as the Leader of the Opposition.

Legislative sessions 

The Legislature had four annual sessions:

  First session: December 27, 1867 to February 24, 1868, with thirty-nine sitting days.
  Second session: January 20, 1869 to April 5, 1869, with forty-eight sitting days.
 Third session: November 23, 1869 to February 1, 1870, with thirty-eight sitting days.
 Fourth and final session: November 3, 1870 to December 24, 1870, with thirty-eight sitting days.

The Legislature did not meet again prior to its dissolution on May 27, 1871.

References

001